Oscar Arthur von Riesemann ( – ) was a Baltic German lawyer and politician who was the mayor of Reval from 22 December 1877 to 6 April 1878.

A member of a prominent Baltic German family that had origins in Lübeck, von Riesemann studied the arts abroad. He formulated the Governorate of Estonia's provincial property tax. He was the first mayor of Reval in nearly a century, after the end of the mayoralty of Wilhelm Hetling. This was due to the revocation of the Magistracy of Reval, the governing institution of the city at the time. In 1864, he was appointed the head legal counsel of the Reval Magistrate. He was later elected by the Reval Landtag at the Reval Town Hall in 1877, due to his sympathy for the concerns of the majority Estonian population. He emerged as a central figure in the opposition to the main Baltic German party in the elections to the first independent Reval city council. He was succeeded by Baron Alexander Rudolf Karl von Uexküll.

See also
List of mayors of Tallinn

References

1833 births
1880 deaths
Politicians from Tallinn
People from the Governorate of Estonia
Baltic-German people
Mayors of Tallinn
19th-century Estonian lawyers